Mendeira is a village in the Portuguese parish of Cernache de Bonjardim, having less than twenty inhabitants. The village is near Mount Mendeira and the Zêzere River.In this village lives the Dutch painter Els Smulders-Waijers, see Schilderen in Portugal and her site.

References

Villages in Portugal
Populated places in Castelo Branco District